Mia Hammermann (born 19 March 1997) is a Liechtensteiner footballer who plays as a defender for Staad and the Liechtenstein national football team. She is the first Liechtenstein player to have played in the United States.

Career statistics

International

References

1997 births
Living people
Women's association football defenders
Liechtenstein women's footballers
Liechtenstein women's international footballers